1D1 60051 was a class of one prototype diesel-electric locomotive built for the PLM in 1934 by CEF.

The diesel locomotive was numbered as 141 AMD 1 when with the PLM, and was included in the inventory of the SNCF at its inception in 1938. It was numbered as 141 DA 1 in the 1950s, before the renumbering of 1962.

See also 
 List of SNCF classes

References

D,1D1 60051
SNCF locomotives
Railway locomotives introduced in 1934
1′Do1′ locomotives
Standard gauge locomotives of France